C. mollis may refer to:
 Clitoriopsis mollis, a plant species
 Cratylia mollis, a plant species in the genus Cratylia

See also 
 Mollis (disambiguation)